Phoxocampus is a genus of pipefishes native to the Indian and Pacific Oceans, with these currently recognized species:
 Phoxocampus belcheri (Kaup, 1856) (rock pipefish)
 Phoxocampus diacanthus (L. P. Schultz, 1943) (spined pipefish)
 Phoxocampus tetrophthalmus (Bleeker, 1858) (trunk-barred pipefish)

References

Syngnathidae
Marine fish genera
Taxa named by Charles Eric Dawson